Vermaaklikheid is a settlement on South Africa's Garden Route in the Western Cape. It is situated near Witsand and close to Duiwenhoks River. The area is a fynbos shrubland that has a temperate climate. More than 100 species of birds live here.

References

External links
 Vermaaklikheid web site
 Duiwenhoks Conservancy

Populated places in the Hessequa Local Municipality